The Mukden Palace, or Shenyang Imperial Palace, was the former palace of the Later Jin dynasty and the early Qing dynasty. It was built in 1625, and the first three Qing emperors lived there from 1625 to 1644. Since the collapse of imperial rule in China, the palace has been converted to a museum that now lies in the center of Shenyang, Liaoning.

History
Early construction began in 1625 by Nurhaci, the founder of the Later Jin dynasty. By 1631, additional structures were added during the reign of Nurhaci's successor, Hong Taiji.

The Mukden Palace was built to resemble the Forbidden City in Beijing. However, the palace also exhibits hints of Manchu and Tibetan architectural styles.

After the Qing dynasty replaced the Ming dynasty in 1644 in Beijing, the Mukden Palace lost its status as the official residence of the Qing emperor. Instead, the Mukden Palace became a regional palace.

In 1780, the Qianlong Emperor further expanded the palace. Successive Qing emperors usually stayed at the Mukden Palace for some time each year.

In 1955, the Mukden Palace was converted into the Shenyang Imperial Palace Museum.

In 2004, it was included in the UNESCO World Heritage List as an extension of the Imperial Palace of the Ming and Qing Dynasties, or Forbidden City, in Beijing.

Structure 
The Mukden Palace covers an area of around 60,000 square meters, with over 300 buildings and 20 courtyards. According to its layout, it can be divided into three parts: East Section, Middle Section and West Section, and set Middle Section as the main body. The East and West Sections were built in the Nurhachi Period. The layout of the building from the Eight Banners system in the East Section is a unique feature of the Mukden Palace. It is the stereotype of the minority system reflect on the architecture of the Qing dynasty. It combines the architectural features of the Han, Manchu and Mongol peoples.

The main part of the Middle Section is located in the centre of the ancient city of Shenyang, built in the Hong Taiji period. The buildings are arranged on a central axis with a number of symmetrical out-buildings on either side. The West Road building was built in 1783.

This kind of structure constitute with a clear primary and secondary status, strict functional division, and centralized the overall composition with obviously Manchu living feature, but also have disadvantages which are full in the column but lack in row.

East Section 
The Dazheng Hall (大政殿) and the Shiwang Pavilion (十王亭) built for the Nurhachi period. It was founded in 1625 and is the place where the emperor held the "Great Ceremony" and the office of the Eight Banners Minister. Dazheng Temple is an octagonal heavy-duty building with a yellow glazed tile and green trimming, 16 multicoloured glazed ridges, large wooden frame structure, with Mortise and tenon joint, flying roof arch, colour painting and dragon plate, which is the traditional architectural form of the Han Dynasty. Additionally, the decoration of Cintamani and the Sanskrit ceiling add the feature of the religious and ethnic minority architecture style. The layout of the DazhengHall and the Shiwang Pavilion constitute a complete group of buildings in the East Section.

Middle Section 
Daqing Gate, Chongzheng Hall, Fenghuang Building, Qingning Palace, etc., it was built from 1627 to 1635. It was the place where the emperor carried out political activities and the living palace of the Royal Intermarriage wives. The most representative building of the middle section is the Fenghuang Building, a palace which was built on the 4-meter-tall blue-brick platform, as the place of the emperor holding banquets and Sightseeing point. It opens in the east, the palace in Fenghuang Building is connected with religious rituals, and the room in the west is surrounded by Kang bed-stove, which uses as a way to keep warm in Northern part of China, and the chimney is located at the back, which is an architectural feature of the Manchu People.

West Section 
Stage, Jiayintang, Wenshangge and Yangxizhai were built in 1782. When the emperor of Qing dynasty "East Tour" to Shengjing (Shenyang), It was the place reading books, watching dramas and room of storing "Siku Quanshu". The entire architectural design and layout reflect the emperor's so-called "dignity" and strict feudal hierarchy. Under the social conditions of the time, the feudal rulers built palaces of this size, which brought great suffering and disaster to the working people, drove thousands of craftsmen and peasants, working day and night. Every temple in the Forbidden City, every brick and tile, every stone and wood, condenses the wisdom and blood of the working people. The manpower and material resources of building this palace cannot be counted. In Mukden Palace, only the roof is worth 680,000 Tael, which is equivalent to the annual ration of 450,000 poor peasants.

The Mukden Palace is not only an ancient palace complex but also famous for its rich and precious collections both in domestic and international. The Mukden Palace Museum displays a large number of artifacts which are left in the old-time, such as the sword of Nurhachi, the waist knife and antler chairs of Hong Taiji.

Collections 
The collections of the Mukden Palace Museum are based on the Qing imperial collection, including porcelain, enamel, lacquerware, sculpture, calligraphy and painting, weaving embroidery, etc. Which has both the historical and cultural features of the Early and late Qing dynasty costumes and palace art that has a rich cultural connotation and artistic value.

References

External links

English-language official website

Houses completed in 1625
Buildings and structures in Shenyang
Palaces in China
World Heritage Sites in China
Royal residences in China
Major National Historical and Cultural Sites in Liaoning
Museums in Liaoning
Qing dynasty architecture
1625 establishments in Asia
National first-grade museums of China